Michael Flaherty may refer to:

Michael F. Flaherty (born 1969), Boston politician
Michael F. Flaherty Sr. (born 1936), former judge and former member of the Massachusetts House of Representatives
Michael J. Flaherty (1862–1921), Wisconsin politician
Micheal Flaherty (educator), maker of educational films
Michael Patrick Flaherty, character from the sitcom Spin City
Michael John Flaherty (1917–1992), Irish hurler

See also
Michael O'Flaherty (disambiguation)